Dorsoporidae is a family of millipedes belonging to the order Polydesmida.

Genera:
 Dorsoporus Loomis, 1958
 Speleoglomeris

References

Polydesmida